The Buell–Stallings–Stewart House is a historic residence in Greenville, Alabama.  The house was built in 1874 by a local lawyer David Buell, who later sold it to U. S. Congressman Jesse F. Stallings. Stallings sold the house to A. Graham Stewart, a local merchant, in 1901. The house is built in a Carpenter Gothic style, rare in Alabama, and features a steeply sloped roof and several sharply pointed gables and dormers. A flat-roofed, octagonal porch projects over the front entry. Each window and door is topped with a decorative Gothic arch molding with a diamond in the middle.  The house was listed on the National Register of Historic Places in 1986.

References

National Register of Historic Places in Butler County, Alabama
Houses completed in 1874
Houses in Butler County, Alabama
Carpenter Gothic architecture in Alabama
Greenville, Alabama
Houses on the National Register of Historic Places in Alabama